Jingwanzi is an urban subdistrict, located in the built-up area of Yuhua District in Changsha City, Hunan Province, China. The new Jingwanzi was formed in 2012, the former Yuhuating subdistrict was divided into two subdistricts, new Yuhuating and Jingwanzi. The subdistrict has borders with Dongjing Subdistrict to the south, Lituo Subdistrict to the east, Yuhuating Subdistrict to the north, Wenyuan and Qingyuan Subdistricts of Tianxin District to the west.

References

Yuhua District, Changsha
Yuhua District